Five Dials is a digital literary magazine published from London by Hamish Hamilton, an imprint of Penguin Books. Edited by Craig Taylor, Five Dials features short fiction, essays, letters, poetry, reporting from around the world  (humbly tagged “Currentish Events”) and illustrations. The magazine is free and distributed in Portable Document Format (PDF) approximately every month.

Though available online, the magazine is intended to be printed and enjoyed on paper. Five Dials is downloadable from the Hamish Hamilton website and subscribers receive email notifications about new issues. In his editor's letter for the June 2008 inaugural issue, Craig Taylor described Five Dials as “the product of a few editors and writers who would like to push a small enterprise into the inboxes of anyone interested in good writing.”

History 

Named for a seedy and now-extinct part of London named after the junction of five streets (Moor Street, Dudley Street, Little Earl Street, West Street & Grafton Street), and subsequently destroyed between 1883 & 1887 when Cambridge Circus and Charing Cross Road were formed  not very far from the current site of Hamish Hamilton's offices on the Strand, Five Dials features work from voices as canny and irrepressible as the misfits who once populated the area. Notable contributors include famous authors living and deceased such as Raymond Chandler, Noam Chomsky, Alain De Botton, Zadie Smith, Dave Eggers, Jonathan Safran Foer, Hari Kunzru, J. M. G. Le Clézio, Deborah Levy and Susan Sontag, but the magazine also showcases work from lesser-known journalists, unpublished creative thinkers and even former nuns. Five Dials was once described as "the biggest literary juggernaut journal never to have hit newsstands".

Themed Issues 

Since the magazine launched in 2008 there have been several themed issues of Five Dials, focusing on a variety of topics including Broken Britain, obscenity, memoir, the late David Foster Wallace and the American elections. The 'Festival Issue' included pieces by musicians from Arcade Fire, James Murphy of LCD Soundsystem and a cameo from Iggy Pop. The fourteenth issue of the magazine was entirely dedicated to Orhan Pamuk's essay, delivered after he won the Nobel Prize for Literature in 2006. Recently "Five Dials" collaborated with the Woodland Trust and novelist Tracy Chevalier on the 22nd issue of the magazine. The most popular issue to date is Five Dials 26, a Berlin special which so far has been downloaded over 140,000 times. Upcoming issues of Five Dials will cover themes such as Jokes, Remixes and Australia...

Events 

Five Dials has staged several events in the UK and abroad to celebrate the release of the magazine. In September 2009, the Paris issue was launched from the famous Shakespeare and Company bookstore on the Left Bank, with readings from writers Steve Toltz and Joe Dunthorne; the tenth issue was released at an event held in conjunction with Book Slam at London's Wilton's Music Hall in February 2010; and the recent Quebec issue was launched in Montreal. The magazine attracted positive attention from the Canadian and Québécois press, including the Montreal Mirror, the Montreal Gazette, and The Walrus.

In October 2012 Five Dials released its first single (music) at an event staged at London's Rough Trade (shops) East. The single is a 10" dub remix of Hollis Hampton-Jones's novel, "Comes the Night", with Hampton-Jones backed by Ryan Norris of Nashville-based band Lambchop. The b-side is an exclusive remix of the Lambchop song 'Gone Tomorrow'.

Literary magazine 

Five Dials is one of several magazines that have been credited with the rebirth of the literary journal, albeit in a slightly different form to publications such as the London Review of Books. Articles either about or referencing Five Dials have appeared in The Guardian, The Times, and UK publishing's trade magazine The Bookseller.

Five Dials continues to grow in profile and is still run by Craig Taylor, who is assisted by Hamish Hamilton staff and a team of volunteers in the making of the magazine. Excerpts from Five Dials have appeared in The Guardian, and journalists continue to praise its progress, calling Five Dials "understatedly hip", a "heartbreaking PDF of staggering Internet genius" and "handsomely typset, beautifully illustrated and gloriously devoid of adverts".

References

External links
 Official Site

2008 establishments in the United Kingdom
Literary magazines published in the United Kingdom
Monthly magazines published in the United Kingdom
Hamish Hamilton books
Magazines published in London
Magazines established in 2008